Klupci is a locality of Serbia located in the municipality of Loznica, district of Mačva.

Klupci the village
In 2002 it had a population of 7297 inhabitants, 95% of which were ethnic Serbs.
In spite of the number of its inhabitants, Klupci is officially classified among the villages of Serbia.

The elementary school is named after the Serbian philosopher and linguist Dositej Obradović.

Klupci also has a football team FK Radnički Stobex. They currently play in the Serbian League West (Srpska liga Zapad), a third tier in Serbia's football league.

See also
 Loznica
 Museum in Loznica

References
1 ^ Popis stanovništva, domaćinstava i Stanova 2002. Knjiga 1: Nacionalna ili etnička pripadnost po naseljima. Republika Srbija, Republički zavod za statistiku Beograd 2003.

External links

 Official website

Populated places in Mačva District
Loznica